Ministry of Ceremonies or Ceremonial may refer to:

 Ministry of Ceremonies of imperial China
 Ministry of Ceremonies of imperial Japan prior to the Meiji Restoration, referring to either of
 Jibu-shō
 Shikibu-shō